Bounce keys is a feature of computer Desktop Environments. It is an accessibility feature to aid users who have physical disabilities.  Bounce keys allows the user to configure the computer to ignore rapid, repeated keypresses of the same key.

External links
How to configure Bounce Keys in Microsoft Windows 10

Computer accessibility
User interface techniques